Rajashree Nagarkar is a performing artist and award winning film actress from Maharashtra an Indian state. She is a shishya of Babasaheb Mirajkar of Kolhapur. She runs a school: Kalika Kala Kendra for the training of artists in the Lavani-Tamasha art form and a theater at Supa in Ahmednagar district. She belongs to the Kolhati community.

Awards and achievements 
 38th Maharashtra State Film Award for best debut performance as an actress in 2001. 
 Sahakar Maharshi Shankarrao Mohite-Patil Lavani Kalavant Puraskar in 2003.
 Mahindra Natraj Puraskar. 
 Pandit Jasraj Puraskar.
 Maharashtra Kala Niketan Puraskar.

References 

Year of birth missing (living people)
Living people
Indian musical theatre actresses